Maggi Payne (born 1945, Temple, Texas, United States) is an American composer, flutist, video artist, recording engineer/editor, and historical remastering engineer who creates electroacoustic, instrumental, vocal works, and works involving visuals (video, dance, film, slides).

Biography
Payne raised in Amarillo, Texas, and attended Interlochen Music Camp and Aspen Music School. She received her B. Mus. in applied flute at Northwestern University, studying with Walfrid Kujala, flute, and Alan Stout, Ted Ashford, and M. William Karlins, composers. She received her M. Mus. at the University of Illinois Urbana-Champaign, studying with composers Gordon Mumma, Ben Johnston, and Salvatore Martirano. She studied with Robert Ashley at Mills College, where she received her MFA in electronic music and recording media.

She has collaborated since the 1980s with video artist Ed Tannenbaum, composing several works for his Technological Feets live dance/video-processing performances and built a flame speaker at the Exploratorium in collaboration with Nick Bertoni (1983–1985). Payne has been a recording engineer at Music and Arts record label since 1981, where she has recorded both contemporary and historical music. Her video works include Crystal, Io, Circular Motion, Solar Wind, Airwaves (realities), Liquid Metal, Apparent Horizon, Liquid Amber, Effervescence, Cloud Fields, Quicksilver, and Through the Looking Glass. Her films include Orion and Allusions. Her works involving dance include System Test (fire and ice) and Allusions. Her works have been choreographed by Molissa Fenley, Wendy Rodgers, Gina Gibney, Gail Chodera, Deoborah Hay, Carla Blank Reed, and Carolyn Brown.

Payne's works are available on Aguirre, Innova, Root Strata, Lovely Music, Starkland, The Label, Music and Arts, Centaur, Ubuibi, MMC, New World Records (CRI), Digital Narcis, Frog Peak, Asphodel, and/OAR, Capstone, and Mills College labels.

She has received two Composer's Grants and an Interdisciplinary Arts Grant from the National Endowment for the Arts, and video grants from the Mellon Foundation and the Western States Regional Media Arts Fellowships Program. She has received four honorary mentions from Bourges, one from Prix Ars Electronica, and placed in the Barlow and "Luigi Russolo" per giovani compositor di Musica Elettroacoustica competitions.

Commissions include National Flute Association High School Soloist Competition 2005, flutist Nina Assimakopoulos, pianist Sarah Cahill, trombonist Abbie Conant, Starkland, composer Annea Lockwood, composer/pianist David Mahler, and the Hartt School of Music at Hartford.

Payne has also had works selected and performed on the 60x60 project for the years 2003, 2004, 2005, and 2006.

She is currently Co-Director of the Center for Contemporary Music (CCM) at Mills College in Oakland, California, where she teaches recording engineering, composition, and electronic music.

Discography
Solo releases:
 2017 Crystal LP re-release, Aguirre Records: includes White Night, Scirocco, Crystal, and Solar Wind
 2014 Desertscapes, for two spatially separated women’s choirs, CD, Lorelei Ensemble, Beth Willer, conductor and artistic director 
 2012 Ahh-Ahh Music for Ed Tannenbaum’s Technological Feets 1984-1987 LP, Root Strata: includes Flights of Fancy, Gamelan, Shimmer, Back to Forth, Ahh-Ahh (ver 2.1), and Hikari 
 2010 Arctic Winds CD (electroacoustic) Innova Recordings: includes Fluid Dynamics, Distant Thunder, Apparent Horizon, Arctic Winds, System Test (fire and ice), Glassy Metals, and FIZZ
 2003 Ping/Pong: Beyond the Pail  CD, And/oar (soundscapes)
 1991 Crystal re-released on CD, Lovely Music (electroacoustic): includes White Night, Solar Wind, Scirocco, Crystal  +  additional tracks Ahh-Ahh (ver 2.1), Subterranean Network, Phase Transitions
 1986 Crystal  LP, Lovely Music (electroacoustic): includes White Night, Scirocco, Crystal, Solar Wind

Compilation albums:
 2017 BAM, on the Acoustic Deconstruction LP, The Label 
 2016 Reflections, for solo flute on VAYU: Multi-cultural Flute Solos From the Twenty-First Century CD, AMP Recordings, Nina Assimakopoulos, flute 
 2015 Beyond, for Steven M. Miller on Between Noise and Silence, Innova Recordings CD/DVD 
 2014 Black Ice and STATIC on Gravity Spells: Bay Area New Music & Expanded Cinema Art DVD/LP handmade boxed set created and curated by John Davis—limited edition 
 2013 Pop on SEAMUS Electro-Acoustic Miniatures 2012: Re-Caged CD, SEAMUS
 2008 60X3, on the "60x60 (2006–2007)" 2-CD set, Vox Novus
 2007 System Test (fire and Ice) on the "Far and Wide" DVD, Computer Music Journal (Winter 2007, Vol. 31/No. 4)
 2007 :60 Fizz (electroacoustic), on the "60x60 (2004–2005)" 2-CD set, Vox Novus
 2006 ReCycle (electroacoustic), on the "Women Take Back the Noise" CD, Ubuibi
 2006 Of All for solo flute (Nina Assimakopoulos, flute), on the "Points of Entry: Laurels Project, Volume I" CD, Capstone Records
 2006 it's elemental (soundscape), on the "Overheard and Rendered" CD, And/oar
 2005 field recordings edited by Chris Cutler on the "Twice Around the Earth" CD, ReR Megacorp
 2004 60 Spin (electroacoustic), on the "60X60" CD, Capstone Records, CPS-8744
 2001 Moiré (electroacoustic) on the soundtrack for Jordan Belson: Collected Films: Bardo
 2000 White Turbulence 2000 (four channel electroacoustic work), on the "Immersion" DVD-V/DVD-A, Starkland
 2000 breaks/motors (electroacoustic), on the "Oasis: Music from Mills 2001" CD, Mills College
 1999 HUM, Aeolian Confluence, and Inflections, on "The Extended Flute" CD, CRI
 1999 Raw Data (electroacoustic), on the "End ID" CD, Digital Narcis Ltd.
 1998 Chris Mann Piece (electroacoustic), on "The Frog Peak Collaborations Project" CD, Frog Peak
 1998 She Began, with text by writer Melody Sumner Carnahan, on "The Time is Now" CD, Frog Peak
 1996 Desertscapes, for 2 spatially separated choirs, on the "Desertscapes" CD, MMC
 1996 Moiré (electroacoustic), on the "Storm of Drones" CD, Asphodel Records
 1994 Resonant Places (electroacoustic), on the "Consortium to Distribute Computer Music (CDCM)—Music from the Center for Contemporary Music (CCM) at Mills College" CD, Centaur
 1988 Airwaves (realities) (electroacoustic), on the "Another Coast" CD, Music and Arts
 1986 Subterranean Network, on the "Mills College Centennial" 3-LP album, Mills College
 1980 Lunar Dusk and Lunar Earthrise (electroacoustic), on the "Lovely Little Records" boxed set of six 7" records, Lovely Music

As performer:
 1999 flutist on "The Extended Flute" CD, CRI (performing works by Maggi Payne, David Behrman, William Brooks, Mark Trayle, Roman Haubenstock-Ramati)
 1996 flutist on "Non Stop Flight" by Pauline Oliveros, CD on Music and Arts
 1981 flutist on Healing Music by Joanna Brouk, Hummingbird Productions
 1978 flutist and bowed psalter player on "Summer Music" by Jacques Bekaert, LP on Lovely Music
 1977 flutist on "On the Other Ocean" by David Behrman, LP on Lovely Music (re-released on CD 1996, Lovely Music)
 1977 flutist on "Star Jaws" by Peter Laurence Gordon, LP on Lovely Music
 1977 flutist on "Out of the Blue" by Blue Gene Tyranny, LP on Lovely Music (re-released on CD 2007, Unseen Worlds)

Print publications
 2008 The San Francisco Tape Music Center, 1960s Counterculture and the Avant-Garde by David Bernstein, University of California Press, contribution as interviewer
 2002 Music with Roots in the Aether, Robert Ashley, article on Gordon Mumma, p. 109-124, written about 1976
 2000 Desertscapes, for two spatially separated choirs (1991), score published on Treble Clef Music

References

External links
 Official website
 Comprehensive presentation of Maggi Payne's artistic career
 Golden, Barbara. “Conversation with Maggi Payne.” eContact! 12.2 — Interviews (2) (April 2010). Montréal: CEC.

1945 births
American women composers
21st-century American composers
American flautists
Living people
Interlochen Center for the Arts alumni
Place of birth missing (living people)
Bienen School of Music alumni
University of Illinois at Urbana–Champaign School of Music alumni
Mills College alumni
Mills College faculty
Women flautists
21st-century American women musicians
American women in electronic music
21st-century women composers
American women academics
21st-century flautists